Erruca is a genus of tiger moths in the subfamily Arctiinae erected by Francis Walker in 1854. Most species were formerly included in the genera Cosmosoma or Mallodeta.

Species
Erruca cardinale (Hampson, 1898)
Erruca consors (Walker, 1854)
Erruca cruenta (Perty, 1834)
Erruca deyrolii (Walker, 1854)
Erruca erythrarchos (Walker, 1854)
Erruca hanga (Herrich-Schäffer, [1854])
Erruca sanguipuncta (Druce, 1898)

References

Euchromiina